Smith's Ferry may refer to:
Smith's Ferry, California
Smith's Ferry, Idaho, a community or hamlet in Valley County, Idaho
Smith's Ferry, Massachusetts